Marylouise Burke is an American actress. Her roles have included the 2004 Alexander Payne film Sideways, in which she played Phyliis, the mother of the lead character. On stage, she has appeared off-Broadway in Fuddy Meers in 1999, winning the Drama Desk Award for Featured Actress in a Play, and in Kimberly Akimbo in 2003, receiving a Drama Desk Award, Outstanding Actress in a Play nomination. She also played the role of Jack's mother in the 2002 Broadway revival of Into the Woods.

Biography
Burke was born and raised in Steelton, Pennsylvania, attended Lebanon Valley College (in Annville, Pennsylvania), and earned an M.A. in English literature at the University of Wisconsin. She moved to New York City at age 32 to try acting, after working as a copy editor and research assistant.

Stage
Burke has appeared on Broadway in Inherit the Wind in 1996, Into the Woods in 2002 as Jack's mother, Is He Dead? in 2007, Fish in the Dark in 2015, and True West in 2018-19.

She has appeared in many Off-Broadway plays. She appeared in the David Lindsay-Abaire play Ripcord at the Manhattan Theatre Club Stage I, which opened in October 2015. This is the fourth play by Lindsay-Abaire in which she appeared.

She first appeared Off-Broadway in The Broken Pitcher by Heinrich Von Kleist at the Martinique Theatre in October 1981. She played "Gertie" in Fuddy Meers which opened at the Manhattan Theatre Club Stage II in November 1999. She appeared in Wonder of the World, written by David Lindsay-Abaire at the Manhattan Theatre Club Stage I in 2001.

Burke played the title role in Kimberly Akimbo, which premiered Off-Broadway at the Manhattan Theatre Club New York City Center Stage 1 in February 2003. She performed in Kimberly Akimbo in its debut at the South Coast Repertory Theatre in Costa Mesa, California from April to May 2001.

She won the 2000 Drama Desk Award for Outstanding Featured Actress in a Play for her appearance as Gertie in Fuddy Meers and was nominated for the 2003 Drama Desk Award, Outstanding Actress in a Play for Kimberly Akimbo.

Burke received the 2014 Obie Award for Sustained excellence of performance.

She was awarded the Richard Seff Award, presented by Actors Equity Foundation for 2019. The award is 
given to "veteran female and male character actors for their performances in a supporting roles in a Broadway or Off-Broadway production."

Film
Burke played Lillian in Meet Joe Black (1998) and the role of Miles' mother in the 2004 film Sideways. She played Delores in the 2005 film The Baxter. She also played Sylvia in 2014 film Wild Canaries. Most recently she has been on the Netflix series as Marty and Wendy Byrde's corrupt marital therapist, Sue Shelby, on Ozark in 2020.

Television

Burke starred in a commercial for Esurance entitled "Beatrice" circa 2014. One of Burke's lines has become a popular meme: "That's not how it works. That's not how any of this works."

Filmography

Film

Television

References

External links

Actresses from Pennsylvania
American film actresses
American stage actresses
American television actresses
Year of birth missing (living people)
Drama Desk Award winners
Obie Award recipients
People from Dauphin County, Pennsylvania
Living people
Lebanon Valley College alumni